Nat Singh Somnath (1915 – 13 April 1988) was an Indian athlete. He competed in the men's hammer throw at the 1948 Summer Olympics.

References

External links
 

1915 births
1988 deaths
Athletes (track and field) at the 1948 Summer Olympics
Indian male hammer throwers
Olympic athletes of India
Sportspeople from Jalandhar
Asian Games medalists in athletics (track and field)
Athletes (track and field) at the 1951 Asian Games
Asian Games silver medalists for India
Medalists at the 1951 Asian Games